In mathematics, a Følner sequence for a group is a sequence of sets satisfying a particular condition.  If a group has a Følner sequence with respect to its action on itself, the group is amenable. A more general notion of Følner nets can be defined analogously, and is suited for the study of uncountable groups.  Følner sequences are named for Erling Følner.

Definition 

Precisely,
For every , there exists some  such that  for all , and
Explanation of the notation used above:
 is the cardinality of a set .
Thus, what this definition says is that for any group element , the proportion of elements of  that are moved away by  goes to 0 as  gets large.

In the setting of a locally compact group acting on a measure space  there is a more general definition. Instead of being finite, the sets are required to have finite, non-zero measure, and so the Følner requirement will be that
 ,
analogously to the discrete case. The standard case is that of the group acting on itself by left translation, in which case the measure in question is normally assumed to be the Haar measure.

Examples 

 Any finite group  trivially has a Følner sequence  for each .
 Consider the group of integers, acting on itself by addition. For large , the symmetric difference has size , while  has size .
 With the original definition of Følner sequence, a group has a Følner sequence if and only if it is countable and amenable.
 A locally compact group has a Følner sequence (with the generalized definition) if and only if it is amenable and second countable.

Proof of amenability 
The natural definition that uses our Følner sequence would be

Of course, this limit doesn't necessarily exist.  To overcome this technicality, we take an ultrafilter  on the natural numbers that contains intervals .  Then we use an ultralimit instead of the regular limit:

It turns out ultralimits have all the properties we need.  Namely,
 is a probability measure.  That is, since the ultralimit coincides with the regular limit when it exists.
 is finitely additive.  This is since ultralimits commute with addition just as regular limits do.
 is left invariant.  This is since

by the Følner sequence definition.

References 

 

Geometric group theory